Johnny Allen (born September 17, 1934, in Greenville, South Carolina) is a NASCAR Grand National Series driver from 1955–1967. He won one race in his career, the 1962 Myers Brothers 200 at the Bowman-Gray Stadium on June 16, 1962. Allen filled in for Jack Smith in the 1961 Volunteer 500 at Bristol Motor Speedway and won the race, but the win was credited to Smith because Smith had started the race. He scored 19 career top-five and 61 top-ten finishes.

References

External links

1934 births
NASCAR drivers
Sportspeople from Greenville, South Carolina
Racing drivers from South Carolina
Living people